Alabato is a village in the Oio Region of northern Guinea-Bissau. Alabato has a wet, tropical savannah climate.

Location
It is located east of Cufeu.

References

External links
Maplandia World Gazetteer

Populated places in Guinea-Bissau
Oio Region